The 2019 World Mountain Running Challenge was the 35th edition of the global Mountain running competition, World Mountain Running Championships, organised by the World Mountain Running Association.

The 2019 World Long Distance Mountain Running Championships was disputed in the same place the day after.

Senior

Individual

Men

Women

Team

Men

Women

See also
2019 World Long Distance Mountain Running Championships

References

External links
 

World Mountain Running Championships
World Mountain Running